Brampton Assembly Plant is a Stellantis Canada automobile factory located at 2000 Williams Parkway East Brampton, Ontario, Canada. Originally built by American Motors Corporation (AMC) for US$260 million, in the former Bramalea area of Brampton, the manufacturing plant was specially designed for building the Eagle Premier. Its role since has primarily been to assemble full-sized Chrysler products.

It was originally opened as the "Bramalea Assembly" under American Motors. At the time, AMC had another facility that was known as "Brampton Assembly" which was located at Kennedy Road/Steeles Avenue in Brampton. It had been built and operated from 1961 until 1992 under American Motors and later Chrysler, assembling American Motors and Jeep vehicles. The new Bramalea Assembly was renamed the Brampton Assembly under Chrysler after the old plant was closed in 1992 and sold off for warehouse use.

History 
In June 1984, American Motors established an agreement with the governments of Ontario and Canada to build a new assembly plant. Both the national and provincial governments loaned AMC  each to build the  facility. The agreement also included a royalty to the governments equal to 1% of the sales price of every vehicle produced at the facility.

The infrastructure builder EllisDon Construction completed the US$260 million (US$ in  dollars ) plant and associated buildings.

The production line speed was initially about 400 cars per shift (54 jobs per hour) with only one shift scheduled. There were frequent layoffs at this new factory, while AMC's old Brampton plant, located at Kennedy Road, worked steadily to produce Jeep Wranglers.

This facility was acquired (along with the rest of AMC) by Chrysler in August 1987. The factory was ranked top in Chrysler's 1988 quality audit of cars produced in each of the automaker's plants.

Production of the Chrysler LH platform cars began in June 1992 and continued with the updated LH cars in 1997. Production switched to the rear-wheel drive Chrysler LX platform cars in January 2004. The retooling for the LX platform was described as "a low-budget effort", as Chrysler was experiencing some hardships at the time. Robots in the body shop were hand-me-downs from other plants. The paint shop was said to be the oldest FiatChrysler had in North America at that time.

The attached "Brampton Satellite Stamping", which opened in 1991, was built for the launch of the Chrysler LH platform. At that time, Brampton Assembly operated with three shifts of production. It is the city of Brampton's largest employer, with over 4,200 people working there.

On 19 July 2007, Chrysler Group announced an investment of US$1.2 billion in the Brampton plant for upgrades to the Chrysler 300 series, Dodge Magnum, and Dodge Charger, as well as a $500 million manufacturing investment to prepare for European-market LX platform product loading.

On 16 August 2007, the one-millionth LX rear-wheel-drive vehicle platform rolled-off Brampton Assembly's production line.

On 1 November 2007, Chrysler LLC announced that it was ending the third shift in Brampton, with the loss of 1,000 direct jobs, and declared that production of the Dodge Magnum in Brampton would end in early 2008.

On 1 May 2009, both the Brampton Assembly and Windsor Assembly plants were shut down as a result of Chrysler's bankruptcy protection filing on 30 April 2009, in the United States, affecting about 2,700 employees at the Brampton Assembly and 4,400 at the Windsor Assembly. A Chrysler parts plant in Etobicoke, Toronto operated until 10 May 2009, when it was closed down for 30 to 60 days, affecting 300 employees, while the company through restructuring under court-ordered creditor protection.

After the reorganization, Chrysler announced the launch of new models of the 300 and Charger to be produced in the Brampton assembly plant, beginning in 2010.

The factory began production of the redesigned 2011 Chrysler 300 in January 2011. At this time, total employment was 2,871 (2,733 hourly; 138 salaried), working two shifts.

In 2012, employees at the Chrysler factories in Windsor and Brampton, Ontario ratified the CAW's labor agreement by an overwhelming majority, without any information from the automaker about plans for new products or investment at either plant. As of December 2012, the Brampton Assembly Plant is the single largest employer in Canada's 11th largest city.

On 19 August 2014, the first Challenger SRT Hellcat (VIN #700001) rolled off the assembly line. It sold at the Barrett-Jackson auction in Las Vegas auction for $825,000 that benefitted Opportunity Village, a non-profit charity for those with intellectual disabilities in the Las Vegas area. Rick Hendrick, owner of Hendrick Motorsports, bought the 707-hp "pony car" for his collection.

The plant earned "bronze status" in 2015 for its work in implementing "World Class Manufacturing" (WCM), a "methodology that focuses on eliminating waste, increasing productivity, and improving quality and safety in a systematic and organized way."

Fiat Chrysler Automobiles announced in May 2019 plans for investments in new and existing assembly plants in Michigan "after intense political pressure in the U.S. to increase domestic manufacturing." This strategy could be an opportunity for Canadian parts suppliers, but also mean cuts in production at FCA's facilities in Ontario that include Brampton Assembly. Although there is still demand for the models produced by Brampton Assembly, "the market has gone really soft for cars, especially for sedans" and future FCA products may not use the platform currently made for the Chrysler 300, Dodge Charger, and Dodge Challenger.

As of 2021, the facility may see a new generation of the LX platform or be converted to making batteries for the automaker given its proximity to other Stellantis facilities. Because the property is in a rapidly expanding suburb of Toronto, the increasing traffic congestion impeeds shipments while the outright sale of the land would make it excellent for housing development.

In 2022, Stellantis announced an $2.8 billion (3.6 billion Canadian dollars) investment, thus preserving the futures of its Canadian operations in Windsor and Brampton assembly plants. This includes Brampton Assembly Plant making a transition to new "flexible architecture" for the company's electrification plans. Further changes were released that production of its new STLA Large platform cars will be in Windsor with Chrysler 300, Dodge Charger, and Dodge Challenger assembly ending at Brampton in 2024." The Brampton plant will then undego retooling and modernizing to be "flexible, multi-energy vehicle assembly facilities" to "produce the electric vehicles of the future."

Current production 

2005 – Present Chrysler 300
2006 – Present Dodge Charger
2008 – Present Dodge Challenger

Former products 

1988 – 1992 Eagle Premier
1990 – 1992 Dodge Monaco
1993 – 1997 Eagle Vision
1993 – 2004 Chrysler Concorde
1993 – 2004 Dodge Intrepid
1994 – 1996 Chrysler New Yorker
1994 – 2001 Chrysler LHS
1999 – 2004 Chrysler 300M
2005 – 2008 Dodge Magnum
2011 – 2014 Lancia Thema

Annual production 
1988 = 59,068
1989 = 33,904
1990 = 24,676
1991 = 18,133
1992 = 50,660
1993 = 256,754
1994 = 256,211
1995 = 188,782
1996 = 238,965
1997 = 204,137
1998 = 300,866
1999 = 338,921
2000 = 291,884
2001 = 198,965
2002 = 201,723
2003 = 140,642
2004 = 209,045
2005 = 318,536
2006 = 314,161
2007 = 273,285
2008 = 210,704
2009 = 121,715 (Bankruptcy Year)
2010 = 163,257
2011 = 194,631
2012 = 240,193
2013 = 244,771
2014 = 222,829
2015 = 253,230
2016 = 237,483
2017 = 231,816
2018 = 233,261
2019 = 202,447
2020 = 155,552 (Pandemic)
2021 = 146,423 (Microchip shortage)

Total production through 2021 = 6,777,630

Notes

External links
 
 

American Motors
Chrysler factories
Motor vehicle assembly plants in Canada